El Rosal is a municipality and town of Colombia in the Western Savanna Province, part of the department of Cundinamarca. It is part of the Metropolitan Area of Bogotá. El Rosal borders Subachoque in the northeast, San Francisco in the northwest, Madrid in the southeast and Facatativá in the southwest.

History 
The area of Subachoque, of which El Rosal was a part until 1903, in the times before the Spanish conquest, was inhabited by the Muisca. The zipa of Bacatá ruled over Subachoque. The Panche lived to the west of Subachoque and when the conquistadores arrived, they took advantage of the situation and entered the Muisca territories. Subachoque and El Rosal were submitted by Nicolás de Federman in 1538.

The Muisca agriculture consisted of potatoes, maize, coca, arracacha, sweet potatoes, tubers and chungua.

Modern El Rosal was founded on March 28, 1903 by Ana Vicenta González.

Economy 
A large percentage of this agricultural community is employed by large scale flower growers in the production of roses, carnations, astromelias and other varieties of flowers. Other crops which contribute to the economy are potatoes, carrots, corn, sweetpeas, string beans and herbs. Wheat was a major crop until the 1930s when the price fell and made it economically unfeasible to continue planting it. Dairy farms, meat cattle, goats and horses are also vital parts of the El Rosal economy.

References 

Municipalities of Cundinamarca Department
Populated places established in 1903
1903 establishments in Colombia